Elmler Akademiyasi is a Baku Metro station. It was opened on 31 December 1985. It is named after the Azerbaijan National Academy of Sciences which is nearby.

See also
List of Baku metro stations

References

Baku Metro stations
Railway stations opened in 1985
1985 establishments in Azerbaijan